The AT&SF Freight Office is a historic building in Downtown Albuquerque, New Mexico. It was built by the Atchison, Topeka and Santa Fe Railway in 1946 and is a notable example of Mission Revival architecture. The building was listed on the New Mexico State Register of Cultural Properties in 2012 and the National Register of Historic Places in 2013.

The warehouse and its associated loading platform were demolished in the 1980s when the railroad moved its regional freight operations to Belen. The Freight Office survived and is currently part of the Alvarado Transportation Center property, though vacant.

The building is two stories high with a basement and was designed in a stripped-down Mission style to harmonize with adjacent railroad buildings including the depot and the Alvarado Hotel, both no longer standing. It is built from structural clay tile with a concrete frame, and the exterior is finished with pebble-dash stucco. The front elevation of the building includes a flat-roofed entry porch, wood-framed sash windows with heavy concrete lintels, and  original neon signs.

References

Railway buildings and structures on the National Register of Historic Places in New Mexico
National Register of Historic Places in Albuquerque, New Mexico
Office buildings in Albuquerque, New Mexico
Office buildings completed in 1946
New Mexico State Register of Cultural Properties
Buildings of the Atchison, Topeka and Santa Fe Railway